Litan is a 1982 French horror film co-written, produced, edited, and directed by Jean-Pierre Mocky and Jean-Claude Romer. It stars Marie-José Nat, Jean-Pierre Mocky, Nino Ferrer, and Marisa Muxen.

Plot

A young couple passes through the village of Litan as the locals hold a Festival of the Dead. As the festival progresses, strange, and eerie events occur that reveals something sinister at work. Fearing for their lives, the couple decided to flee the village before they too become overtaken by the dark implications of the celebration and become shadows of their former selves.

Cast 
 Marie-José Nat - Nora
 Jean-Pierre Mocky - Jock
 Nino Ferrer - Le docteur Steve Julien
 Marisa Muxen - Estelle Servais 
 Bill Dunn - Cornell
  - Bohr
 Dominique Zardi - Le chef des fous

Release

Reception

Awards and nominations
Litan won the Critics Award at the Avoriaz Fantastic Film Festival. It also won the award for Best Screenplay at the Catalonian International Film Festival.

References

External links 
 
 
 

1980s avant-garde and experimental films
1982 films
1982 horror films
Films set in France
Films shot in France
French avant-garde and experimental films
French horror films
1980s French-language films
Films directed by Jean-Pierre Mocky
1980s French films